Stephanie Hazard (born 29 November 1989, Subiaco) is a New Zealand competitive sailor. She competed at the 2012 Summer Olympics in London, in the women's Elliott 6m, with Jenna Hansen and Susannah Pyatt.

References

External links

1989 births
Living people
New Zealand female sailors (sport)
Olympic sailors of New Zealand
Sailors at the 2012 Summer Olympics – Elliott 6m
People from Western Australia